Jouy-aux-Arches is a commune in the Moselle department in Grand Est in north-eastern France. The remains of a Roman aqueduct from the 1st century have been preserved on the territory of Jouy-aux-Arches and the neighbouring commune Ars-sur-Moselle.

See also
 Communes of the Moselle department

References

External links
 

Jouyauxarches